Ban Hin Kiong is a Taoist temple at jalan D.I. Panjaitan, Manado. It is the oldest temple in the city of Manado. This temple was established in 1819, then in 1893 there was built a shrine or known as Tek Kong Su in Hokkien. At the beginning, the building was made of bamboo wood.

Ban means abundant, Hin means blessings or prosperity, and Kiong means palace.

History 
The Ban Hin Kiong temple has been organizationally managed since 1935 through an organization Sam Khauw Hwee association founded on the efforts and initiative of two figures: Yo Sio Sien and Que Boen Tjen.

On 14 March 1970 Ban Hin Kiong temple was burned by several people. On the initiative of Nyong Loho (Soei Swie Goan) who later served as chairman of development and chief of the Ban Hin Kiong temple, renovation construction began. Ban Hin Kiong temple (commonly abbreviated BHK) has undergone several renovations of the building, both the addition of the floor and courtyard.

See also 
 Kim Tek Ie Temple (金德院), Jakarta
 Vihara Bahtera Bhakti (安卒大伯公廟), Jakarta
 Boen Tek Bio (文德廟), Tangerang
 Tay Kak Sie Temple (大覺寺), Semarang
 Sanggar Agung (宏善堂), Surabaya
 Hoo Ann Kiong Temple (護安宮), Riau
 Gunung Timur Temple (東嶽觀), Medan
 Satya Dharma Temple (保安宮), Bali

References 

Taoist temples in Indonesia
Religious buildings and structures completed in 1746
Buildings and structures in North Sulawesi
Tourist attractions in North Sulawesi